Calobre   is a town and corregimiento in Calobre District, Veraguas Province, Panama with a population of 2,514 as of 2010. It is the seat of Calobre District. 

The name "Calobre" was given after the "cacique" of this lands. It has a population of 937 inhabitants. Calobre is a vivid and beautiful town that is well known for its production of watermelon. The main activities are agriculture and tourism. 

Its production of watermelon is the best in the whole country thanks to its lands and rivers that make the perfect environment for its growth. Besides watermelon, Calobre also produces orange, mandarin, grapefruit, lemons, cantaloupe, papaya, mamey, cashew, carrot, tomatoes, lettuce, cucumbers, etc. Many of these are exported. 

Around March this town has its "Watermelon Fair," where its locals promote and sell handcrafts such as hats, dresses and other articles from the region, and vegetables grown in the lands of Calobre. The locals and residents from close areas assist to this event also to take advantage of the low prices of the products sold at this fair.  

Calobre has exciting touristic destinations such as the forest reserve "La Yeguada" and its lagoon, the volcano "Media Luna" and hot springs. Tourists usually camp in "La Yeguada" and around the volcano "Media Luna" where the temperatures are very nice. The hot springs are also very visited since it is said in the town that these hot springs are born of a volcano that once made eruption.

References

Corregimientos of Veraguas Province
Populated places in Veraguas Province